Wanzhou Wuqiao Airport  is an airport serving Wanzhou District of Chongqing, China. The airport was opened on 29 May 2003.

History
Wanzhou was formerly served by the military Liangping Airport. Its runway was too short for civil use, but the plan to extend it was abandoned. Instead, the new Wuqiao Airport was built by cutting into mountains and filling bottomlands. It has a runway that is 2400 meters long and 45 meters wide (class 4C), capable of operating Airbus A320 and Boeing 737 airplanes.

Airlines and destinations

See also
 List of airports in China
 List of the busiest airports in China

References

External links
 

Airports in Chongqing
Airports established in 2003
2003 establishments in China